Bruna Vas is a small settlement in the Municipality of Mokronog-Trebelno in southeastern Slovenia. It lies on the regional road to Sevnica, just north of Mokronog on the right bank of the Mirna River. The area is part of the historical region of Lower Carniola. The municipality is now included in the Southeast Slovenia Statistical Region.

References

External links

Bruna Vas on Geopedia

Populated places in the Municipality of Mokronog-Trebelno